Marius-François Gaillard (13 October 1900 – 20 August 1973) was a French pianist and composer.

References

1900 births
1973 deaths